The Three Principles of the People (also translated as the Three People's Principles, San-min Doctrine, or Tridemism) is a political philosophy developed by Sun Yat-sen as part of a philosophy to improve China made during the Republican Era. The three principles are often translated into and summarized as nationalism, democracy, and the livelihood of the people. This philosophy has been claimed as the cornerstone of the nation's policy as carried by the Kuomintang (KMT); the principles also appear in the first line of the national anthem of the Republic of China.

Origins

In 1894 when the Revive China Society was formed, Sun only had two principles: nationalism and democracy. He picked up the third idea, welfare, during his three-year trip to Europe from 1896 to 1898. He announced all three ideas in the spring of 1905, during another trip to Europe. Sun made the first speech of his life on the "Three Principles of the People" in Brussels. He was able to organize the Revive China Society in many European cities. There were about 30 members in the Brussels branch at the time, 20 in Berlin, and 10 in Paris. After the Tongmenghui was formed, Sun published an editorial in Min Bao (民報).  This was the first time the ideas were expressed in writing. Later on, in the anniversary issue of Min Bao, his long speech of the Three Principles was printed, and the editors of the newspaper discussed the issue of people's livelihood.

The ideology is said to be heavily influenced by Sun's experiences in the United States and contains elements of the American progressive movement and the thought championed by Abraham Lincoln. Sun credited a line from Lincoln's Gettysburg Address, "government of the people, by the people, for the people", as an inspiration for the Three Principles. Dr. Sun's Three Principles of the People are inter-connected as the guideline for China's modernization development as stretched by Hu Hanmin.

The Principles

Mínzú or Civic Nationalism
The Principle of Mínzú (民族主義, Mínzú Zhǔyì) is commonly rendered as "nationalism". "Mínzú" or "People" describes a nation rather than a group of persons united by a purpose, hence the commonly used and apt translation as "nationalism".

National Independence 
Sun saw the Chinese Nation as under threat of annihilation by the imperialist powers. To reverse the trajectory of such decline, China needs to become nationally independent both externally and internally.

Internally, national independence meant independence from the Qing Manchus who ruled China for centuries. Sun thought that the Han Chinese people were the people without their own nation and thus strove for national revolution against Qing authorities.

Externally, national independence meant independence from imperialist foreign powers. Sun believed China to be threatened by imperialism in three ways: by economic oppression, by political aggression, and by slow population growth. Economically, Sun held the mercantilist position that China was being economically exploited by unbalanced trade and tariffs. Politically, he looked toward the unequal treaties signed by China as the reason of China's decline. Sun envisioned a future China that is strong and capable of fighting imperialists and standing on the same stage as western powers.

Five Races Under One Union 

Although Sun initially believed in a form of Han nationalism to oppose the rule of the Qing Dynasty, he later came to accept Liang Qichao’s civic nationalist idea of a unified Chinese nation. To achieve "national independence", Sun believed that China must first develop a "China-nationalism," Zhonghua Minzu, as opposed to an "ethnic-nationalism". Sun developed the principles of Five Races Under One Union to unite the five major ethnic groups of China  Han, Mongols, Tibetans, Manchus, and the Muslims (such as the Uyghurs)  under one "Chinese Nation". This principle is symbolized by the Five Color Flag of the First Republic of China (1911–1928). He believed that China must develop a "national consciousness" so as to unite the Chinese people in the face of imperialist aggression. He argued that "minzu", which can be translated as "people", "nationality", or "race", was defined by sharing common blood, livelihood, religion, language, and customs. Sun also believed in a form of interculturalism that assimilate ethnic minorities into the dominant Han culture, not through brute force, but by a process of naturalization.

Mínquán or Governance Rights
The Principle of Mínquán (民權主義, Mínquán Zhǔyì) is usually translated as "democracy"; literally "the People's power" or "government by the People." To Sun, it represented a Western constitutional government. He divided political life of his ideal for China into two sets of "powers": the power of politics and the power of governance.

Four Rights of the People 
The power of politics are the powers of the people to express their political wishes and keep administrative officers in check, similar to those vested in the citizenry or the parliaments in other countries, and is represented by the National Assembly. The power of the people is guaranteed by four constitutional rights: the right to election (選舉), recalling (罷免), initiative (創制), and referendum (複決). These may be equated to "civil rights".

Five Power Constitution 

The power of governance are the powers of the administration to govern the people. He criticized the traditional three-branch democratic government for vesting too much power in the legislative branch. He expanded and reworked the European-American three-branch government and the system of checks and balances by incorporating traditional Chinese administrative systems to create a government of five branches (each of which is called a Yuan) in a system known as the Five Power Constitution. The state is divided into five "Yuan"s: Legislative Yuan, the Executive Yuan, and the Judicial Yuan came from Montesquieuan thought; the Control Yuan and the Examination Yuan came from Chinese tradition. (Note that the Legislative Yuan was first intended as a branch of governance, not strictly equivalent to a national parliament.)

Mínshēng or Welfare Rights

The Principle of Mínshēng (民生主義, Mínshēng Zhǔyì) is sometimes translated as "the People's welfare/livelihood," "Government for the People" or "Socialism" . The concept may be understood as social welfare and as a direct criticism of the inadequacies of unregulated capitalism. He divided livelihood into four areas: clothing, food, housing, and mobility; and planned out how an ideal (Chinese) government can take care of these for its people.

Equalization of Land Rights 

Sun Yat-sen was influenced by the American thinker Henry George and intended to introduce a Georgist tax reform. The land value tax in Taiwan is a legacy thereof. Sun Yat-sen said that land value tax as "the only means of supporting the government is an infinitely just, reasonable, and equitably distributed tax, and on it we will found our new system."

Sun proposed a land reform system known as "equalization of land rights", which involves the implementation four different acts: regulation of land price, in which each landowner reports the value of their property sans improvement; taxation of land, which involves a land value tax set on all land properties; purchase of land, which sets up a system where government can purchase land for public use by eminent domain; and profit belongs to the public, in which a 100% tax is levied on all profit gained from trading of land (sans improvement). According to Sun, the existence of land purchase and land taxation guarantees that landowner wouldn't over-report (which would lead to high taxation on land) nor under-report (which would lead to their land being cheaply acquired for eminent domain) their land values.

However, the Kuomintang failed to achieve any successful land reform Sun envisioned in Mainland China and only succeeded in Taiwan.

Impact 
Sun died before he was able to fully explain his vision of this Principle and it has been the subject of much debate within both the Chinese Nationalist and Communist Parties, with the latter suggesting that Sun supported socialism. Chiang Kai-shek further elaborated the Mínshēng principle of both the importance of social well-being and recreational activities for a modernized China in 1953 in Taiwan.

Canon

The most definite (canonical) exposition of these principles was a book compiled from notes of speeches that Sun gave near Guangzhou (taken by a colleague, Huang Changgu, in consultation with Sun), and therefore is open to interpretation by various parties and interest groups (see below) and may not have been as fully explicated as Sun might have wished. Indeed, Chiang Kai-shek supplied an annex to the Principle of Mínshēng, covering two additional areas of livelihood: education and leisure, and explicitly arguing that Mínshēng was not to be seen as supporting either communism or socialism.
The French historian of Chinese history, Marie-Claire Bergère's view is that the book is a work of propaganda. Its purpose is to appeal to action rather than to thought. As Sun Yat-sen declared, a principle is not simply an idea; it is "a faith, a power."

Legacy

The Three Principles of the People were claimed as the basis for the ideologies of the Kuomintang under Chiang Kai-shek, the Reorganized National Government of China under Wang Jingwei, and an inspiration of the Chinese Communist Party under Mao Zedong as the stage of ‘old democracy’. The Kuomintang and the Chinese Communist Party largely agreed on the meaning of nationalism but differed sharply on the meaning of democracy and people's welfare, which the former saw in Western social democratic terms and the latter interpreted in Marxist and communist terms. The Japanese collaborationist government interpreted nationalism less in terms of anti-imperialism and more in terms of cooperating with Japan to advance theoretically pan-Asian, but in practice, typically Japanese interests.

Republic of China (Taiwan)

There were several higher-education institutes (university departments/faculties and graduate institutes) in Taiwan that used to devote themselves to the 'research and development' of the Three Principles in this aspect. Since the late 1990s, these institutes have re-oriented themselves so that other political theories are also admitted as worthy of consideration, and have changed their names to be more ideologically neutral (such as Democratic Studies Institute).

In addition to this institutional phenomenon, many streets and businesses in Taiwan are named "Sān-mín" or for one of the three principles. In contrast to other politically derived street names, there has been no major renaming of these streets or institutions in the 1990s.

Although the term "Sanmin Zhuyi" (三民主義) has been less explicitly invoked since the mid-1980s, no political party has explicitly attacked its principles with practices under the Martial Law ruling era then except the Tangwai movement groups such as Democratic Progressive Party. The Three Principles of the People remains explicitly part of the platform of the Kuomintang and in the Constitution of the Republic of China.

As for Taiwan independence supporters, some have objections regarding the formal constitutional commitment to a particular set of political principles. Also, they have been against the mandatory indoctrination in schools and universities, which have now been abolished in a piecemeal fashion beginning in the late 1990s. However, there is little fundamental hostility to the substantive principles themselves. In these circles, attitudes toward the Three Principles of the People span the spectrum from indifference to reinterpreting the Three Principles of the People in a local Taiwanese context rather than in a pan-Chinese one.

People's Republic of China 
The Three Principles of the People has been reinterpreted by the Chinese Communist Party to argue that communism is a necessary conclusion of the Three Principles of the People and thus provides legitimacy for the communist government. This reinterpretation of the Three Principles of the People is commonly referred to as the New Three Principles of the People (also translated as Neo-tridemism), a word coined by Mao's 1940 essay On New Democracy, in which he argued that the Communist Party is a better enforcer of the Three Principles of the People compared to the bourgeois Nationalist Party and that the new three principles are about allying with the communists and the Russians (Soviets), and supporting peasants and the workers. Proponents of the New Three Principles of the People often claim that Sun's book Three Principles of the People acknowledges that the principles of welfare is inherently socialistic and communistic.

In response to a question from a Reuters reporter in 1945, Mao Zedong, former Chairman of the Communist Party of China, said: "A free and democratic China will be a country in which all levels of government up to the central government are elected by universal, equal, secret suffrage and are accountable to the people who elected them. It would realize Dr. Sun Yat-sen's Three Principles of the People, Lincoln's principles of government of the people, by the people, and for the people, and Roosevelt's Four Freedoms. It will guarantee the country's independence, unity, unification and cooperation with the democratic powers."

Vietnam
The Vietnam Revolutionary League was a union of various Vietnamese nationalist groups, run by the pro-Chinese Việt Nam Quốc Dân Đảng. The Việt Nam Quốc Dân Đảng translates directly into Vietnamese Kuomintang, and it was based on the Chinese Kuomintang party. Its stated goal was for unity with China under the Three Principles of the People, and opposition to Japanese and French imperialists. The Revolutionary League was controlled by Nguyễn Hải Thần, who was born in China. General Zhang Fakui blocked the Communists of Vietnam, and Ho Chi Minh from entering the league, as his main goal was Chinese influence in Indochina. The KMT utilized these Vietnamese nationalists during World War II against Japanese forces.

The motto of Independence - Freedom - Happiness of the Democratic Republic of Vietnam and the Socialist Republic of Vietnam, despite its communist political background, was also taken from the Three Principles of People.

Tibet
The pro-Kuomintang and pro-ROC Khamba revolutionary leader Pandatsang Rapga, who established the Tibet Improvement Party, adopted Dr. Sun's ideology including the Three Principles, incorporating them into his party and using Sun's doctrine as a model for his vision of Tibet after achieving his goal of overthrowing the Tibetan government.

Pandatsang Rapga hailed the Three Principles of Dr. Sun for helping Asian peoples against foreign imperialism and called for the feudal system to be overthrown. Rapga stated that "The Sanmin Zhuyi was intended for all peoples under the domination of foreigners, for all those who had been deprived of the rights of man. But it was conceived especially for the Asians. It is for this reason that I translated it. At that time, a lot of new ideas were spreading in Tibet", during an interview in 1975 with Dr. Heather Stoddard. Dr. Sun's ideology was put into a Tibetan translation by Rapga. 

He believed that change in Tibet would only be possible in a manner similar to when the Qing Dynasty was overthrown in China. He borrowed the theories and ideas of the Kuomintang as the basis for his model for Tibet. The party was funded by the Kuomintang and by the Pandatsang family.

Singapore
The establishment of the People's Power Party in May 2015 by opposition politician Goh Meng Seng marks the first time in contemporary Singaporean politics that a political party was formed with the Three Principles of the People and its system of having five branches of government as espoused by Sun Yat-Sen as its official guiding ideology.

The People's Power Party has adapted the ideas with a slight modification to the concepts of the Five Powers in order to stay relevant to modern contemporary political and social structures. The emphasis is put on the separation of the Five Powers which naturally means the separation of certain institutions from the Executive's control.

The power of impeachment (originally under the Control Yuan) has been expanded to include various contemporary functional government institutions. Examples include the Corrupt Practices Investigation Bureau, advocacy of the Ombudsman Commission, Equal Opportunity Commission, freedom of the press and freedom of speech.

The power of examination has been adapted and modified to fit the modern concept of selection for both political leaders as well as civil servants. This involves institutions like the Elections Department and Public Service Commission.

The People's Power Party advocates that the institutions included in these two powers, namely the power of impeachment and the power of selection, be put under the supervision of Singapore's elected president.

See also

 Constitution of the Republic of China
 Democracy in China
 History of the Republic of China
 Kuomintang
 National Anthem of the Republic of China
 National Revolutionary Army
 Republic of China (1912–1949)
 Politics of the Republic of China
 Whampoa Military Academy
 Three Principles of the Equality (Korean)
 Five Principles of Peaceful Coexistence
 Kemalism

References

Bibliography
Sun Yat-sen, translated by Pasquale d'Elia.The Triple Demism of Sun Yat-Sen. New York: AMS Press, Inc., 1974.

External links
 The Three Principles of the People (1924) by Sun Yat-Sen

 
1911 Revolution
Books in political philosophy
Centre-right ideologies
Chinese nationalism
Conservatism in Taiwan
Economic progressivism
Government of the Republic of China
Ideology of the Kuomintang
Nationalism in Asia
Political theories
Politics of the Republic of China
Social philosophy
State ideologies
Syncretic political movements